The Suzuki 250 GP racers were a series of 250cc racing motorcycle designed, developed and built by Suzuki, to compete in the Grand Prix motorcycle racing world championship, between 1962 and 1970.

References

250 GP
Grand Prix motorcycles